Howard & Sons is a furniture maker in London, England. The main address was at Berners Street 25–27.

History 
The business was opened in 1820.  
Their sofas and chairs became popular during the Victorian era amongst the upper class. They collaborated with Gillows of Lancaster. They supplied furniture to the Savoy Hotel in London. Howard & Sons received a number of Royal Warrants of Appointment.

See also 
 Hampton & Sons, contemporary maker of similar furniture

References

External links 
 Howard & Sons London, the original makers of Howard & Sons furniture 
 Chairs - Catalogue - Dean Antiques Ltd, Howard and Sons chairs and sofas 
 Howard Original Pictures - Howard Sofas 
 Howard & Sons

British Royal Warrant holders
Companies based in London
History of furniture
Furniture companies of England